Ireland competed at the 1952 Summer Olympics in Helsinki, Finland. 19 competitors, all men, took part in 18 events in 6 sports. Ireland won its silver medal when John McNally reached the Bantamweight final

Medalists

Silver
 John McNally - Boxing, Men's Bantamweight

Athletics

Boxing

Equestrian

Fencing

Four fencers, all men, represented Ireland in 1952.

Men's foil
 Harry Thuillier
 Patrick Duffy

Men's épée
 Tom Kearney
 Patrick Duffy
 George Carpenter

Sailing

Wrestling

References

Nations at the 1952 Summer Olympics
1952
1952 in Irish sport